Óscar Climent Sanchis is a former Grand Prix motorcycle racer from Spain. He currently races in the FIM CEV Superbike European Championship aboard a Yamaha YZF-R1, and has previously competed in the Spanish CEV 125GP Championship, the Spanish Supersport Championship, Spanish Moto2 Championship and the RFME Campeonato de Espana Velocidad Superstock 600.

Career statistics

By season

Races by year
(key)

References

External links

Spanish motorcycle racers
Living people
1992 births
Moto2 World Championship riders